Up Romance Road is a 1918 American silent comedy film directed by Henry King and starring William Russell, Charlotte Burton, and John Burton.

Cast
 William Russell as Gregory Thorne 
 Charlotte Burton as Marta Millbanke 
 John Burton as Samuel Thorne 
 Joseph Belmont  as Thomas Millbanke 
 Carl Stockdale as Count Hilgar Eckstrom 
 Emma Kluge as Mrs. Millbanke 
 Claire Du Brey as Hilda

References

Bibliography
 Donald W. McCaffrey & Christopher P. Jacobs. Guide to the Silent Years of American Cinema. Greenwood Publishing, 1999.

External links

1918 films
1918 comedy films
Films directed by Henry King
American silent feature films
1910s English-language films
American black-and-white films
1910s American films
Silent American comedy-drama films